Shaun Sawyer QPM was the chief constable of Devon and Cornwall Police until 2022, having been appointed in February 2013 to succeed Stephen Otter.

Sawyer began his police career in 1986, as a uniformed constable in London. His Metropolitan Police roles included being in charge of their investigation into the 1999 Ladbroke Grove rail disaster, and being head of counter-terrorism.

He is the National Police Chiefs' Council's lead officer for modern slavery.

His salary on appointment as chief constable was £151,000. He had previously served as acting chief constable, having been deputy chief constable since April 2010.

Sawyer was a named defendant in a civil case brought by a rape victim whose name and address had been published by Devon and Cornwall Police. The force admitted liability and paid compensation and costs running to six figures (pounds sterling), but refused a request from the victim for a meeting with and apology from Sawyer.

Sawyer has a son and daughter.

Honours

Sawyer was awarded the Queen's Police Medal (QPM) in the 2019 New Years Honours List.

References 

Living people
Chief Constables of Devon and Cornwall Police
Year of birth missing (living people)
Metropolitan Police officers
Devon and Cornwall Police recipients of the Queen's Police Medal
English recipients of the Queen's Police Medal